Acton Burnell is a civil parish in Shropshire, England.  It contains 25 listed buildings that are recorded in the National Heritage List for England.  Of these, two are listed at Grade I, the highest of the three grades, two are at Grade II*, the middle grade, and the others are at Grade II, the lowest grade.  The parish includes the village of Acton Burnell and the hamlet of Acton Pigott, and is otherwise rural.  Most of the listed buildings are houses and associated structures, and the other listed buildings are a church, a font in the churchyard, a shop, farm buildings, and a bridge.


Key

Buildings

References

Citations

Sources

Lists of buildings and structures in Shropshire